USCGC Kathleen Moore is the ninth  cutter by Bollinger shipyards delivered to the United States Coast Guard.
She was delivered to the Coast Guard, for pre-commissioning testing, on 28 March 2014.

The first six cutters are home-ported in Miami, Florida.
The second six cutters, including Kathleen Moore, will be home-ported in Key West, Florida. The 58 cutters will replace the Island-class cutters, and together with the smaller Marine Protector-class cutters, will perform the Coast Guard's main offshore patrol duties.

Design
The Sentinel-class cutters were designed to replace the shorter  Island class. Kathleen Moore is equipped with a remote-control  Bushmaster autocannon and four, crew-served M2HB .50-caliber machine guns. The ship has a bow thruster for maneuvering in crowded anchorages and channels. Kathleen Moore also has small underwater fins for coping with the rolling and pitching caused by large waves. The class is equipped with a stern launching ramp, like the Marine Protector class and the eight failed expanded Island-class cutters. The cutter has a complement of twenty-two crew members. Like the Marine Protector class, and the cancelled extended Island-class cutters, the Sentinel-class cutters deploy the Short Range Prosecutor rigid-hulled inflatable boat (SRP or RHIB) in rescues and interceptions.

Operational history

In November 2015 Kathleen Moore participated in the interception and repatriation of 85 individuals who tried to flee Cuba, by sea.

In February, June and July 2016, Kathleen Moore repatriated 10, 83 and 50 Cuban refugees.

Namesake

In 2010, Master Chief Petty Officer of the Coast Guard Charles "Skip" W. Bowen, the U.S. Coast Guard's senior enlisted person at the time, lobbied for the new Sentinel-class cutters to be named after enlisted Coast Guardsmen, or personnel from its precursor services, who had distinguished themselves by their heroism. Moore started working for the U.S. Lighthouse Service when she was 12 years old, and was credited with saving at least 21 lives over the course of her career.

References

External links

Sentinel-class cutters
2014 ships
Ships built in Lockport, Louisiana